Hopefield is a settlement in West Coast District Municipality in the Western Cape province of South Africa on the R45 between Malmesbury and Vredenburg.

History 
Hopefield is the oldest town on the Cape West Coast.

The Dutch Reformed congregation (Zoute Rivier) was established in December 1851 after farmers donated money towards its construction and the town was founded in 1852 on the farm Langekuil. It became a municipality in 1914., and was named after two people who laid it out, Major William Hope, Auditor-General, and a Mr Field.

General 

In earlier years Hopefield was considered the capital of the West Coast, with banks, filling stations and multiple other shops and businesses. The only access to the towns of Vredenburg, Langebaan and Saldanha was through Hopefield. With the re-routing of the R45 road away from the town, and the construction of the R27 (West Coast Road), the importance of the town gradually faded.

Schools 

There are two schools in the town, Hopefield Primary, offering Grade 1-9, and Hopefield High, offering Grade R-12.

References

Populated places in the Saldanha Bay Local Municipality
Populated places established in 1844